Corpusty is a village and former civil parish, now in the parish of Corpusty and Saxthorpe, in the North Norfolk district, in the county of Norfolk, England, situated on the River Bure. Corpusty is about sixteen miles from Norwich and six miles (10 km) from Holt.

History
Corpusty's name is of Viking origin and derives from the Old Norse for raven's path.

In the Domesday Book, Corpusty is recorded as a settlement of 6 households in the hundred of South Erpingham. In 1086, the village was divided between the estates of William de Warenne. William de Beaufeu and William d'Ecouis.

The village was once home to Corpusty and Saxthorpe railway station which opened in 1883 as part of the Midland and Great Northern Joint Railway. The station closed in 1959 yet the infrastructure still remains.

Geography
According to the 2011 Census, Corpusty has a population of 2,322 residents living in 1,193 households.

Corpusty falls within the constituency of North Norfolk and is represented at Parliament by Duncan Baker MP of the Conservative Party.

St. Peter's Church
Corpusty's parish church is of Norman origin and is dedicated to Saint Peter. St. Peter's was significantly remodelled over the Thirteenth and Fourteenth Centuries and subsequently in the Nineteenth Century. By the 1960s, the church began to decline and is now in the care of the Norfolk Churches Trust.

Amenities
Corpusty Primary School is located in the village and operates as part of the Synergy Multi-Academy Trust. In 2022, the school was rated as a 'Good' school by Ofsted.

The Duke's Head in Corpusty is still open and has operated on the site since 1794.

Little London
To the northwest of the village of Corpusty, also on the south side of the River Bure and within the civil parish of Corpusty and Saxthorpe, lies the hamlet of Little London. This comprises one street, which is named The Street (both Corpusty and Saxthorpe also have streets so named).

Civil parish 
On 1 April 1935 the parish of Saxthorpe was merged with Corpusty, on 1 April 2007 the parish was renamed "Corpusty & Saxthorpe". In 1931 the parish of Corpusty (prior to the merge) had a population of 434.

War Memorial
Corpusty shares a war memorial with Saxthorpe which takes the form of a marble plaque inside St. Andrew's Church. It lists the following names for the First World War:
 Second-Lieutenant Maurice J. L. Walker (1893-1917), 6th Battalion, Queen's Royal Regiment
 Petty-Officer Benjamin Betts (d.1915), H.M. Torpedo Boat 10
 Leading-Stoker George Dodd (1892-1916), HMS Queen Mary
 Corporal Stanley C. Harrison (1891-1918), 4th Battalion, Machine Gun Corps
 Corporal John H. Pinchen (1892-1917), 1/5th Battalion, Royal Norfolk Regiment
 Lance-Corporal Robert H. Farrow (1896-1916), 6th Battalion, Border Regiment
 Lance-Corporal Herbert T. Harrison (1894-1917), 8th Battalion, Royal Norfolk Regiment
 Private-First Class George S. Griffiths (1885-1918), 73rd Wing RFC
 Gunner William F. Southgate (1888-1916), 137th (Heavy) Battery, Royal Garrison Artillery
 Private James Roberts (1892-1917), 44th (Western Australia Rifles) Battalion, Australian Imperial Force
 Private Colin G. Pinchen (1895-1917), 6th Battalion, Bedfordshire Regiment
 Private James J. Middleton (1890-1917), 13th Battalion, Essex Regiment
 Private Oscar W. Dodman (1890-1915), 2nd Battalion, Royal Fusiliers
 Private Arthur F. Harrison (1899-1918), 17th Battalion, Royal Fusiliers
 Private Samuel H. Smithson (1882-1917), 2nd Battalion, Royal Lincolnshire Regiment
 Private David J. Bullock (1893-1917), 7th Battalion, Royal Lincolnshire Regiment
 Private Alfred S. R. Harrison (1890-1916), 19th Battalion, Manchester Regiment
 Private Walter A. Potter (d.1917), 19th Battalion, Middlesex Regiment
 Private William R. Hipperson (1896-1915), 1st Battalion, Royal Norfolk Regiment
 Private Alfred K. King (1876-1917), 1st Battalion, Royal Norfolk Regiment
 Private James A. Pye (1891-1917), 1/4th Battalion, Royal Norfolk Regiment
 Private George Allen (1882-1915), 1/5th Battalion, Royal Norfolk Regiment
 Private John Hancock (1879-1915), 7th Battalion, Royal Norfolk Regiment
 Private Sidney J. Faircloth (1895-1916), 8th Battalion, Royal Norfolk Regiment
 Private Henry C. Middleton (1892-1916), 8th Battalion, Royal Norfolk Regiment
 Private J. Thomas Sarsby (1897-1917), 6th Battalion, Northamptonshire Regiment
 Private George H. Hollox (d.1917), 16th Battalion, Northumberland Fusiliers
 Private Frederick A. Margetson (1882-1918), 18th Battalion, Northumberland Fusiliers
 Private Claudley G. Keeler (1890-1917), 25th (Tyneside Irish) Battalion, Northumberland Fusiliers
 Private Walter Allen (1898-1917), 2nd Battalion, Queen's Royal Regiment
 Private Samuel Harrison (1900-1918), 6th Battalion, Queen's Royal Regiment
 Private Walter R. Field (1892-1916), 10th Battalion, Queen's Royal Regiment
 Private Richard T. Griffiths (1885-1917), 12th Battalion, Suffolk Regiment
 Private William R. Hollox (1897-1918), 2nd Battalion, Royal Sussex Regiment
 Private Horace H. Carr (1894-1918), 4th Battalion, Worcestershire Regiment
 Private Frederick W. Howard (1899-1918), 15th Battalion, West Yorkshire Regiment
 Rifleman Ernest R. Faircloth (1894-1918), 2nd Battalion, Royal Ulster Rifles
 Pvt. Albert J. Harrison

And, the following for the Second World War:
 Corporal Herbert J. Roberts (1917-1940), 11th (Field) Company, Royal Engineers
 Private Albert G. Mears (1920-1942), 5th Battalion, Royal Norfolk Regiment
 William Williamson
 Leslie Wright

Notes

External links

Villages in Norfolk
Former civil parishes in Norfolk
North Norfolk